Ulrik Tillung Fredriksen (born 17 June 1999) is a Norwegian footballer who plays as a defender for Haugesund.

Career

Sædalen
Fredriksen started his senior career out with 6. Divisjon side Sædalen. In his first season with the club, he made 5 appearances and scored 2 goals, helping the team to promotion. The next season, he appeared 19 times, scoring 7 goals.

Fyllingsdalen
Fredriksen then moved to FK Fyllingsdalen in 2016. In 14 appearances in the PostNord-Ligaen, he found the net once.

Sogndal
For the 2017 season, Fredriksen moved to Sogndal. He made his Eliteserien debut on 7 May 2017 in a 0-0 draw with FK Haugesund. He was sent off in the 75th minute following a bad foul.

Haugesund
On 13 January 2020 Fredriksen signed with Haugesund.

Career statistics

References

External links
Fredriksen at Sogndal Official Website

1999 births
Living people
Footballers from Bergen
Norwegian footballers
Norway youth international footballers
Norway under-21 international footballers
Association football defenders
FK Fyllingsdalen players
Sogndal Fotball players
FK Haugesund players
Eliteserien players
Norwegian First Division players
Norwegian Second Division players